Bakay-Ata is a district of Talas Region in north-western Kyrgyzstan. The administrative seat lies at Bakay-Ata (the former Leninpol).

Population

Rural communities and villages
In total, Bakay-Ata District includes 19 settlements located in 9 rural communities. Each rural community can consist of one or several villages. The rural communities and settlements in the Bakay-Ata District are:

 Ak-Döbö (seat: Ak-Döbö; incl. Kyzyl-Say and Kyzyl-Charba)
 Aknazarov (seat: Kyzyl-Oktyabr; incl. Kök-Tash, Madaniyat, Tash-Kuduk and Ür-Maral)
 Bakay-Ata (2: center - village: Bakay-Ata; and also village Namatbek)
 Boo-Terek (seat: Boo-Terek)
 Keng-Aral (seat: Keng-Aral)
 Ming-Bulak (seat: Ming-Bulak)
 Oros (seat: Kyrgyzstan; incl. Jon-Korgon and Birinchi May)
 Özgörüsh (seat: Özgörüsh)
 Shadykan (seat: Yntymak; incl. Tüytö)

Notable people 
 Gulsaira Momunova - poet (1937 - 2020).

References 

Districts of Talas Region